"Diez Mil Maneras" is a song performed by Spanish singer David Bisbal, released as the second single from his fifth studio album Tú y Yo, on January 23, 2014. The song was written by Christopher Nissen, Justin Gray, Johan Wetterberg and Ximena Muñoz, and produced by Sebastian Krys.

Charts

Weekly charts

Year-end charts

Certifications

References

2014 singles
David Bisbal songs
Spanish-language songs
Number-one singles in Spain
2014 songs
Universal Music Latino singles